The Alderney Railway on Alderney is the only railway in the Bailiwick of Guernsey, and the only working railway in the Channel Islands. (There is a standard gauge railway at the Pallot Heritage Steam Museum in Jersey, but this provides no actual transport link, only pleasure rides.)

The railway is run by volunteers and usually operates during summer weekends and bank holidays.

History 
The railway was built by the British Government in the 1840s and opened in 1847. Its original purpose was to carry stone from the eastern end of the island to build the breakwater and the Victorian era forts.

Queen Victoria used the railway on three Royal visits to Alderney. On the first visit with Prince Albert on 8 August 1854, the Royal couple rode on a horse-drawn railway tender.

Rolling stock

British Admiralty (1854-1923)
(The railway was, presumably, owned by some other department of the British Government from 1847 to 1854)

Channel Islands Granite Co Ltd (1923-1940)
This company took over the railway in 1923, together with locomotives No.1 and No.2. No.1 was returned to England and replaced by Manning Wardle 0-6-0ST Nitro.

German occupation (1940-1945)
No.2 and Nitro were commandeered by the Germans and are believed to have been shipped to Cherbourg in 1943 or 1944.  The Germans lifted part of the standard gauge line and replaced it with a 600 mm gauge line, worked by two Feldbahn 0-4-0 diesel locomotives.

British Home Office (1945-50s)

The line was restored to standard gauge in 1947–1949 and the following stock was used:

 Sentinel 4wVBT Molly, in service from 1947, withdrawn 1958.  May have been converted to a mobile sand-blaster, which was still extant in 1980.
 Cowans Sheldon steam crane
 Ruston & Hornsby 0-4-0 diesel Molly II
 Wickhams Type 27A trolleys

Alderney Railway Co Ltd (1980-present)

 Bagnall 0-4-0ST J.T. Daly, steam engine built in 1931, in service 1982 until 1996 when sold to the Pallot Heritage Steam Museum, Jersey
 London Underground 1938 Stock from Bakerloo and Northern lines, badly rusted and returned to UK in 2000 as spares.
 Former London Underground 1959 Stock cars nos. 1044 and 1045, 
 A Vulcan Drewry 0-4-0 diesel locomotive no. D100 Elizabeth, bought in 1985.
 A Ruston & Hornsby 0-4-0 diesel Molly II 
 Six Wickham rail cars. 

Molly II is currently awaiting modification to her coupler system, so she can haul the London Underground stock. However, this cannot happen at the moment because she is not yet owned by the Alderney Railway company.

Sheds to house the engines and railway stock were built at Mannez quarry in 1997 and 2008

Notes
 arr. = date arrived on Alderney
 T = tank locomotive
 ST = saddle tank locomotive
 TG = geared tank locomotive
 VBT = vertical boiler tank locomotive

See also
List of Channel Islands railways

References

Bibliography
 Railways of the Channel Islands, A Pictorial Survey compiled by C Judge, published by The Oakwood Press 1992,

External links
 Alderney Railway official website 
 A fan's website
 Photographs of Channel Islands railways (including Alderney)
 Rail 608 31 December 2008 magazine pages 68–69 feature on the Alderney Railway
 The Alderney Breakwater by M. Swift a detailed account in THE INDUSTRIAL RAILWAY RECORD No. 52 – pages 170–173 FEBRUARY 1974 issue
 The Tube Train That Runs In the Channel Islands Video of a journey on the line in 2021

Railway lines in the Channel Islands
Heritage railways in the Channel Islands
Transport in Alderney
Standard gauge railways in the Channel Islands
Transport in Guernsey
Railway lines opened in 1847
1847 establishments in Guernsey